Bibini River is a river within KNUST located in Kumasi in the Ashanti Region of Ghana. It is a tributary of Wiwi or Wewe River. It serves as a source of irrigation for vegetables such as lettuce.

References 

Rivers
Ashanti Region